Rabrovo is a village in the municipality of Valandovo, North Macedonia. It is located just east of Valandovo town.

Demographics
According to the 2002 census, the village had a total of 274 inhabitants. Ethnic groups in the village include:

Macedonians 271
Serbs 3

References

External links

Villages in Valandovo Municipality